The following active airports serve the Greater Victoria, British Columbia, Canada area:

See also

 List of airports in the Gulf Islands
 List of airports in the Lower Mainland
 List of airports in the Okanagan
 List of airports in the Prince Rupert area
 List of airports on Vancouver Island

References

 
Transport in the Capital Regional District
Victoria
Victoria